The 141st Pennsylvania House of Representatives District is located in Southeastern Pennsylvania and has been represented since 2011 by Tina Davis.

District profile
The 141st Pennsylvania House of Representatives District is located in Bucks County. It includes the Sesame Place. It is made up of the following areas:

 Bristol Township (PART)
 Ward 01
 Ward 02
 Ward 03 
 Ward 04
 Ward 05 [PART, Division 02]
 Ward 06
 Ward 07 [PART, Division 02]
 Ward 08
 Ward 09 [PART, Division 01]
 Ward 10
 Ward 11
 Hulmeville
 Middletown Township (PART)
 District Lower [PART, Divisions 01, 03, 04, 06 and 13]
 Penndel

Representatives 
In January 2010, Tony Melio announced that he would not seek re-election, opening the seat to six hopefuls (3 Democrats and 3 Republicans).  In November 2010, Tina Davis was elected to succeed Melio.

Recent election results

References

External links
District map from the United States Census Bureau
Pennsylvania House Legislative District Maps from the Pennsylvania Redistricting Commission.  
Population Data for District 141 from the Pennsylvania Redistricting Commission.

141
Government of Bucks County, Pennsylvania